Bruce Lyon is a film producer, animator, and artist.

Career
In 1980 he won an Academy Award in the Scientific Technical Achievement Category for inventing the Lyon Lamb Video Animation System (shared with John Lamb) a single frame video device for pre-testing animation art before it's committed to final production. He and John also won first place for "Tom Waits for No One" at the 1st Hollywood Film and Video Festival.

External links

References

American film producers
Possibly living people
Year of birth missing (living people)
Academy Award for Technical Achievement winners